Wende Correctional Facility is a maximum security prison located in town of Alden in Erie County, New York, east of Buffalo. The prison is named for this region of Alden. The prison was formerly the site of an Erie County jail, and was sold to the state to further the need for a maximum security state prison.  The Erie County Correctional Facility was built adjacent to Wende.

History 
The state of New York announced its $48 million purchase of the prison on March 24, 1983. At the time of the sale, the facility housed 592 prisoners.

COVID-19 
Like other prisons, Wende was a vector in the COVID-19 pandemic. As of November 6, 2020, 31 prisoners had tested positive for COVID-19; one of the first confirmed infections was that of recently sentenced movie executive Harvey Weinstein. According to a March 31, 2020, statement by the New York State Correctional Officers and Police Benevolent Association, 135 correctional officers at Wende were in quarantine, and 6 had tested positive for the virus.

Controversies 
David McClary, convicted of murdering police officer Edward Byrne, spent three years in solitary confinement while at Wende. In 1999, a federal jury granted him $660,000 in damages.

In 2003, Wende officers ordered that Muslim prisoner Darryl Holland produce a urine sample in a three-hour window for a drug test. Holland, who was fasting for Ramadan, refused to drink water for the sample and was placed in solitary confinement for 77 days. While Judge Michael Anthony Telesca of the U.S. District Court for the Western District of New York granted the prison summary judgement in 2013, a panel of judges from the Second Circuit ruled that Holland could still sue on First Amendment grounds.

Notable inmates 

 Jack Abbott - criminal and author. He died by suicide at Wende in 2002.
 Jimmy Burke - mastermind of the Lufthansa Heist. Burke was imprisoned in Wende until his death in 1996.
 Robert Chambers - the "Preppie Killer."  He was imprisoned in Wende in 2008 and later transferred to Sullivan Correctional Facility.
 Mark David Chapman - the man who murdered John Lennon in 1980. Chapman was transferred from Attica Correctional Facility to Wende in 2012. In March 2022, Chapman was transferred to Green Haven Correctional Facility.
 David Gilbert - participant in the 1981 Brink's robbery and murders. He was released on November 4, 2021.
 Kendall Francois - serial killer
 David Sweat - a man who killed a Broome County sheriff's officer and then led an escape from Clinton Correctional Facility in 2015. He was transferred to Wende in April 2018. In January 2019, Sweat was transferred to Auburn Correctional Facility.
 Maksim Gelman - perpetrator of a 28-hour stabbing spree lasting from February 11 to 12, 2011, in New York City, which involved the killing of four people and the wounding of five others.
 Harvey Weinstein - former film producer and convicted sex offender serving a 23-year sentence. He was transferred to Twin Towers Correctional Facility in Los Angeles where he faces additional sexual assault charges.

References

External links 
  Development of Wende

1923 establishments in New York (state)
Buildings and structures in Erie County, New York
Prisons in New York (state)